Daniel Eugene Ruettiger (born August 23, 1948) is an American motivational speaker and author who played college football at the University of Notre Dame.  His early life and career at Notre Dame were the inspiration for the 1993 film Rudy.

Biography

Early life and family
Daniel Eugene Ruettiger (nicknamed "Rudy") was the third of fourteen children. He was born on August 23, 1948, in Joliet, Illinois, where he grew up with his German American family. Ruettiger did not excel scholastically, at least in part due to dyslexia. He attended Joliet Catholic High School, where he played for locally famous football coach Gordie Gillespie.

Ruettiger joined the United States Navy after high school, serving as a yeoman on a communications command ship for two years; then he worked in a power plant for two years. Ruettiger applied to Notre Dame and was rejected due to his low high school grades. He enrolled and attended nearby Holy Cross College, and after two years was accepted as a student at Notre Dame on his fourth try, in the fall of 1974. It was during his time studying at Holy Cross that Ruettiger discovered he had dyslexia.

College
Head coach Ara Parseghian encouraged walk-on players from the student body. For example, Notre Dame's 1969 starting center, Mike Oriard, was a walk-on who was eventually nominated for a Rhodes Scholarship and earned an NFL contract with the Kansas City Chiefs.

After tremendous hard work, Ruettiger earned a place on the Notre Dame scout team, a squad that helps the varsity team practice for games. Merv Johnson was the coach who was instrumental in keeping Rudy on as a scout-team player.

After the 1974 season, Notre Dame coach Parseghian stepped down and former Green Bay Packers coach Dan Devine was named head coach. In Ruettiger's last opportunity to play for Notre Dame at home, Devine put him into a game as defensive end against Georgia Tech on November 8, 1975. In the movie Rudy, Devine is given a somewhat antagonistic role, not wanting Ruettiger to dress for his last game. In the real life scenario, however, it was Devine who came up with the idea to dress Ruettiger. In the final play of Ruettiger's senior season with the Fighting Irish, he recorded a sack, which is all his Notre Dame stat line has shown. Ruettiger actually played for three plays: a kickoff, an incomplete pass, and on the third play (the game's final play), he sacked Georgia Tech quarterback Rudy Allen. He was carried off the field by his teammates following the game, the first player in Notre Dame history to do so. Only one other player has received such an honor: Marc Edwards in 1995.

Feature film

Ruettiger set up a successful maintenance company and also sold real estate. In 1986, he moved back to South Bend, Indiana and decided to sell his story to be made into a film. Ruettiger's story was told in the 1993 feature film Rudy, which starred actor Sean Astin in the title role. The film was written by Angelo Pizzo and directed by David Anspaugh, both of whom were involved in Hoosiers. Ruettiger appeared in a cameo as a fan behind his father, played by Ned Beatty, during the final game scenes.

Ruettiger has said that the movie is "92% true." The players did not lay down their jerseys; rather, the team captain and one other player requested that he be allowed to play. Dan Devine is given a somewhat antagonistic role in the film, but Devine was actually one of Ruettiger's biggest motivators to return to the team. The groundskeeper named Fortune is a combination of three different people.

Later life 
Ruettiger is a motivational speaker and author.

In 2011, Ruettiger was charged with securities fraud in connection with his role as Chairman of Rudy Beverage, Inc. The government alleged a pump-and-dump scheme. A settlement of the case required Ruettiger to pay $382,866 in fines. In his 2011 book, Rudy: My Story, Ruettiger writes of his dealings with the Securities and Exchange Commission and settlement for alleged securities fraud, stating, "I fell into the same obvious trap the rest of the country had fallen into in all of those boom years" and "I shouldn't have been chasing the money."

In 2017, at the age of 68, Ruettiger was baptized a member of the Church of Jesus Christ of Latter-day Saints in Highland, Utah.

Honors, recognition, and awards
On October 14, 2005, Ruettiger was the master of ceremonies at a pep rally for Notre Dame Football. The Fighting Irish were about to play rival and then #1-ranked University of Southern California (USC) the following day and Head Coach Charlie Weis asked some Notre Dame legends, including Tim Brown and Joe Montana, to come back and speak at the rally. Ruettiger came out of the tunnel at Notre Dame Stadium to a loud ovation. Notre Dame ultimately lost the game.

The inaugural 2007 College Football Rudy Award was held on January 8, 2008, at the Opryland Hotel in Nashville, Tennessee. The College Football Rudy Award was created by the Rudy Foundation and honors Division I football players who demonstrate what Ruettiger refers to as the "Four Cs": character, courage, contribution, and commitment as a member of their team. A similar award for high school students was created in 2009. Trusted Sports and Ruettiger launched the High School Football "Rudy" Awards, which aim to uncover the "Rudy" on every high school football team in America. Inspired by the College Football Rudy Awards, three finalists were announced on February 3, 2010. The winner, Calob Leindecker of Baton Rouge, Louisiana, received a college scholarship totaling $10,000. Two runners-up, Kyle Weafer of Kansas and Justin Ray Duke of Texas each received $5,000 scholarships.

In July 2009, Ruettiger was initiated into the Kappa Sigma fraternity at the Grand Conclave in San Antonio, Texas.

Ruettiger received an honorary doctorate degree from Our Lady of Holy Cross College and Long Island University. He has been given key to the city at numerous cities across the nation along with special proclamations for his inspiration, commitment, and human spirit; one such proclamation from the Governor of Nevada announced an Official Rudy Award Day. He has been recognized by the Texas House of Representatives and President George W. Bush and visited the White House.

Publications
 Rudy's Insights for Winning in Life 
 Rudy's Lessons for Young Champions 
 Rudy & Friends

Notes

External links
 

1948 births
Living people
American people of German descent
American motivational speakers
Notre Dame Fighting Irish football players
Sportspeople from Joliet, Illinois
Players of American football from Illinois
Military personnel from Joliet, Illinois
Writers with dyslexia
Sportspeople with dyslexia
Converts to Mormonism
Holy Cross College (Indiana) alumni